Belgrandia is a genus of very small aquatic snails, operculate gastropod mollusks in the family Hydrobiidae.

Species
Species within the genus Belgrandia include:

Belgrandia alcoaensis
Belgrandia bigorrensis
Belgrandia bonelliana
Belgrandia boscae
Belgrandia cazioti
Belgrandia conoidea
Belgrandia coutagnei
Belgrandia depereti
Belgrandia dunalina
Belgrandia gfrast
Belgrandia gibba
Belgrandia gibberula
Belgrandia heussi
Belgrandia ionica
Belgrandia latina

Belgrandia lusitanica
Belgrandia marginata
Belgrandia mariatheresiae
Belgrandia minuscula
Belgrandia moitessieri
Belgrandia semiplicata
Belgrandia silviae Rolán & Oliveira, 2009
Belgrandia sorgica 
Belgrandia sp. nov. 'wiwanensis'
Belgrandia stochi
Belgrandia targoniana
Belgrandia thermalis
Belgrandia torifera (Dalmatian Belgrande)
Belgrandia varica  (Paget, 1854)
Belgrandia zilchi

References

 
Hydrobiidae